Lomovskayavirus (synonym PhiC31-like viruses, Phic31likevirus) is a genus of viruses in the order Caudovirales, in the family Siphoviridae. Bacteria serve as natural hosts. There are two species in this genus.

Taxonomy
The following species are recognized:
 Streptomyces virus phiBT1
 Streptomyces virus phiC31

Structure
Lomovskayaviruses are nonenveloped, with a head and tail. The head is about 53 nm in diameter, consisting of 72 capsomers. The tail is long and flexible, at about 100 nm long, 5 nm wide, has a 15 nm wide baseplate and four tail fibers ended by terminal knobs.

Genome
Both species have been fully sequenced. They have about 41-42k nucleotides, with 53 and 55 proteins.

Life cycle
Viral replication is cytoplasmic. The virus attaches to the host cell's adhesion receptors using its terminal fibers, and ejects the viral DNA into the host cytoplasm via long flexible tail ejection system. Replication follows the replicative transposition model. DNA-templated transcription is the method of transcription. Once the viral genes have been replicated, the procapsid is assembled and packed. The tail is then assembled and the mature virions are released via lysis. Bacteria serve as the natural host. Transmission routes are passive diffusion.

History
According to ICTV, the genus Phic3unalikevirus was first accepted under the name PhiC31-like viruses in 2004, assigned to family Siphoviridae in order Caudovirales. In 2012, the genus was renamed to Phic3unalikevirus. The genus was later renamed to Lomovskayavirus.

References

External links
 Viralzone: Phic3unalikevirus
 ICTV

Siphoviridae
Virus genera